Adolescent Radioactive Black Belt Hamsters (or ARBBH) was written by Don Chin and originally illustrated by Patrick Parsons (under the name Parsonavich) and later by Sam Kieth. It was initially published January 1986 by Eclipse Comics and later on by Parody Press and then Dynamite Entertainment.

It was the first unofficial spoof of the Teenage Mutant Ninja Turtles, replacing teenage with adolescent, mutant with radioactive, ninja with black belt and turtles with hamsters.

It was a "parody of a parody" as the TMNT started as a parody of popular eighties comics, such as Daredevil and Ronin.

Fictional biography
In 1977, NASA launched a probe containing four hamsters to destroy a mysterious mass of radioactive, gelatinous substance that was hovering around the Earth's atmosphere. Exposure to the substance mutated the hamsters into anthropomorphic creatures, whose vessel later crashed down near a Tibetan monastery. There, they were adopted by the monks and trained in the martial arts. The four of them are named after actors from action and kung fu movies: Clint (Eastwood), Chuck (Norris), Bruce (Lee), and Jackie (Chan).

Overview
The series ran for nine issues from January 1986 to January 1988. There were a number of spin-offs: Adolescent Radioactive Black Belt Hamsters in 3-D (illustrated by Ty Templeton) ran for four issues in 1986  (also available in non-3D editions); Clint: Hamster Triumphant was a two issue series focusing on one of the hamsters; and Adolescent Radioactive Black Belt Hamsters Massacre the Japanese Invasion was a one shot in 1989.  The Hamsters also appeared in Total Eclipse and Naive Inter-Dimensional Commando Koalas.  Don Chin went on to write and edit several other parody-themed works using the same style of humor.

On March 30, 2007, it was announced that Dynamite Entertainment has the rights to reprint the comics, write new comics, and produce collectables based on the property. It will be written by Keith Champagne with art by Tom Nguyen, and the first four-part miniseries was published between January and June 2008.

See also
Pre-Teen Dirty-Gene Kung-Fu Kangaroos

References

External links
Adolescent Radioactive Black Belt Hamsters at Don Markstein's Toonopedia. Archived from the original on March 13, 2012.
Wacky Chin Month at ComicImpact.com

Dynamite Entertainment titles
Eclipse Comics titles
Fictional hamsters
Parody comics
Parodies of comics
Parodies of television shows
Teenage Mutant Ninja Turtles
Comics set in Tibet